The 217th Division was created in November 1949 under the Regulation of the Redesignations of All Organizations and Units of the Army, issued by Central Military Commission on November 1, 1948, basing on the 4th and 5th Division, 2nd Corps, 1st Army Group of the People's Liberation Army of the Nationalist Party of China. Its history can be traced to the 63rd Division, 14th Corps, 1st Army Group of Republic of China Army defected in August 1948.

The division is part of 53rd Corps. Under the flag of 217th division it took part in the Chinese Civil War.

In March 1952 the division was reorganized as 3rd Water Conservancy Construction Division(). 

In July 1953 the division was further reorganized as 1st Road Engineering Division(). 

In 1955 the division was demobilized.

References

中国人民解放军各步兵师沿革，http://blog.sina.com.cn/s/blog_a3f74a990101cp1q.html

Infantry divisions of the People's Liberation Army
Military units and formations established in 1949
Military units and formations disestablished in 1955
1949 establishments in China
1955 disestablishments in China